Robin Lässer (born 12 January 1991) is a Grand Prix motorcycle racer from Germany.

Career statistics

By season

Races by year

References

External links
 Profile on motogp.com

1991 births
Living people
German motorcycle racers
125cc World Championship riders